Filgate is a surname. Notable people with the surname include:

Charles Filgate (1849–1930), Irish cricketer 
Eddie Filgate (1915–2017), Irish politician
Leonard Filgate (born 1947), American artist and illustrator
Roger Filgate (born 1965), American guitarist